James "Jimmy" Jamieson (March 21, 1922 – December 26, 1985) was a Canadian professional ice hockey defenceman who played in one National Hockey League game for the New York Rangers during the 1943–44 NHL season.

See also
List of players who played only one game in the NHL

External links

James Jamieson's obituary

1922 births
1985 deaths
Baltimore Clippers players
Canadian ice hockey defencemen
First Nations sportspeople
New York Rangers players
New York Rovers players
North Dakota Fighting Hawks men's ice hockey coaches
Ice hockey people from Ontario
Sportspeople from Brantford
Canadian expatriate ice hockey players in the United States